The Sex du Coeur (also known as Pointe d'Arvouin) is a mountain of the Chablais Alps, located on the border between Switzerland and France. It lies south of the Cornettes de Bise, between the alp of Le Coeur and the lake of Arvouin.

References

External links
Sex du Coeur on Hikr

Mountains of the Alps
Mountains of Valais
Mountains of Haute-Savoie
Mountains of Switzerland
Two-thousanders of Switzerland